Mondim da Beira is a civil parish in the municipality of Tarouca, Portugal. The population in 2011 was 786, in an area of 7.08 km2.

References

Freguesias of Tarouca